is a municipal university in Japan. It is located in Takasaki, Gunma Prefecture.

History 
After World War II, the national colleges in Gunma Prefecture were merged to constitute Gunma University (GU, whose main campus is in Maebashi). Takasaki City wanted to invite an economic department (faculty) of the national university; the city had one origin of GU - Gunma Youth Normal School, which was located near Takasaki Castle, in the former site of a regiment of Imperial Japanese Army. However, the school facilities were estimated too poor in quality, and no faculty of GU was settled in Takasaki.

In 1952 Takasaki City established its own municipal college - , a college with two-year courses in economics and business. In 1957 the college was developed into Takasaki City University of Economics. At first TCUE had one department: Department of Economics (Faculty of Economics). TCUE added departments and graduate schools as follows:
 1964: Department of Business Management (a part of Faculty of Economics)
 1996: Department of Regional Policy (Faculty of Regional Policy)
 2000: Graduate School of Regional Policy (master's courses)
 2002: Graduate School of Economics and Business Administration (master's courses)
 2002: Graduate School of Regional Policy (doctoral courses)
 2003: Department of Regional Development (a part of Faculty of Regional Policy)
 2004: Graduate School of Economics and Business Administration (doctoral courses)
 2006: Department of Tourism (a part of Faculty of Regional Policy)

Undergraduate schools 
 Faculty of Economics
 Department of Economics
 Department of Business Management
 Faculty of Regional Policy
 Department of Regional Policy
 Department of Regional Activation
 Department of Tourism Policy

Graduate schools 
 Graduate School of Economics and Business Administration
 Graduate School of Regional Policy

Institutes 
 University Library
 Institute for Research of Regional Economy
 Information Center
 Regional Policy Research Center

References 

Public universities in Japan
Universities and colleges in Gunma Prefecture
Educational institutions established in 1952
1952 establishments in Japan
Takasaki, Gunma